Officially National Children's Library named after Khnko Aper ( (Khnko-Apor Anvan Azgayin Mankakan Gradaran)) is a national children's library in Yerevan, Armenia. It was founded in 1933 and renamed after the famous children's writer Khnko Aper (Atabek Khnkoyan) after his death in 1935. Since 1980, the library has been located on Teryan Street in Kentron district, next to the Swan Lake of the Opera House. The architects of the library building were Levon Ghulumyan and Rouzan Alaverdyan. The library is home to a collection of 500,000 books. It has a large reading room with a capacity of 100 seats.

The library has three more sections for Chinese, Iranian, and German literature.

Gallery

See also
National Library of Armenia
Avetik Isahakyan Central Library

References

Buildings and structures in Yerevan
Libraries established in 1933
Library buildings completed in 1980
Armenian culture
Armenia
Libraries in Armenia
Children's libraries